Local elections were held in San Juan on May 9, 2016 within the Philippine general election. The voters elected for the elective local posts in the city: the mayor, vice mayor, the congressman, and the councilors, six of them in the two legislative districts of San Juan.

Background
On September 30, 2015, the current city mayor Guia Gomez, declared that she will run again for the mayoralty seat in the elections, in a political convention held in the Filoil Flying V Arena. Her running mate is incumbent Councilor Janella Ejercito, daughter of Senator Jinggoy Estrada. Gomez is actively supporting the candidacy of Liberal Party presidential candidate Mar Roxas, despite being part of Pwersa ng Masang Pilipino which have been affiliated with the United Nationalist Alliance (UNA) party of fellow presidentiable Jejomar Binay.

Few days later, on October 6, 2015, during the gathering held in San Juan Gym, Vice Mayor Francis Zamora declared his intention to run as Mayor of San Juan, he promised to end the Estrada dynasty in the city who ruled the political landscape for over 46 years. He will be running for the mayoralty seat, against mayor Gomez who is seeking another term for the position. He said that the slogan of San Juan under the reigns of the Estradas, "San Juan Todo Asenso" had no entire progress upon it in the city's economy.

His father Ronaldo Zamora, will seek re-election as congressman, against Jana Ejercito, the cousin of Senators Jinggoy Ejercito Estrada and JV Ejercito.

Vice Mayor Zamora, requested to the PNP on the inclusion of the city in the election hotspots, but the PNP leadership rejects the proposal.

Zamora also proposed a public debate against Gomez to present the platforms for the city's progress. Gomez has yet to be responded to the invitation.

Candidates

Representative, Lone District

Mayor

Vice Mayor

Councilors

Puso ng San Juan

Team San Juan

District 1

|-bgcolor=black
|colspan=8|

District 2

|-bgcolor=black
|colspan=8|

References

2016 Philippine local elections
Elections in San Juan, Metro Manila
2016 elections in Metro Manila